The Valley of Tears is an area in the Golan Heights which was the site of a major battle in the 1973 Yom Kippur War.

Valley of Tears may also refer to:

 Valley of Tears (TV series), an Israeli television series that aired in 2020
 "Valley of Tears" (song), by Fats Domino, released in 1957
 Valley of Tears, a 2015 Tank album
 The Valley of Tears – The Ballads, a 2017 compilation album by British rock band Magnum
 The Valley of Tears (film), a 2012 Canadian film

See also
 Vale of tears, a Christian phrase